Geoff Williams (born 21 November 1957) is a former English professional squash player.

Williams was born in India. He took up squash at Downside School and finally became a professional aged 24 in 1981. He represented England during the 1983 World Team Squash Championships.

References

External links
 

English male squash players
1957 births
Living people
Place of birth missing (living people)
20th-century English people